Gilessundet is a sound that separates Glenhalvøya from Søre Repøya, off Orvin Land at Nordaustlandet, Svalbard. The Gilessundet sound has a width of about one nautical mile. It is named after Dutch navigator Cornelis Giles.

References

Straits of Svalbard